Olimpiu-Dumitru Popescu-Colibași (16 March 1912 – 2 March 1993), nicknamed Tata Pik, was a Romanian handball manager, rugby union player and author of books on sports. He had pioneered handball in the city of Brașov. Popescu-Colibași graduated from the A.N.E.F. in 1937. He helped develop many leading handball players during decades: including Anna Stark, Maria Scheip, Mara Windt, Gerlinde Reip, Edeltraut Franz-Sauer, Iuliana Nako, and Rodica Floroianu.   

As a rugby player, he won the national championship with TCR. In 1934, Popescu-Colibași and the Romania national rugby team appeared against Italy. He was a starter.  

Other honours followed his death: he is the namesake of the multi-purpose, 1,700-seat Dumitru Popescu Colibași Sports Hall in Brașov.

Biography
His father Stan Popescu, a school teacher, was the son of poor peasant farmers from Colibași commune. He had been killed in 1916 during World War I. Popescu-Colibași was raised by his grandfather in Dudești. His mother worked as a civil servant at the court of cassation in Bucharest. Popescu-Colibași attended the high school in the Romanian capital living in the family of Mihail Sadoveanu with whom he was a relative. He married Ivonna Demetrian in 1944, an employee of the Romanian Radio Broadcasting Company.

Achievements

Handball 11s
Progresul Brașov
Liga Națională:
Winner: 1956 
Silver Medalist: 1954
Bronze Medalist: 1955, 1957

Handball 7s
Tractorul Brașov
Liga Națională: 
Bronze Medalist: 1959, 1962

See also
 List of Romania national rugby union players

References

External links
  

  
1912 births 
1993 deaths
People from Ilfov County 
Romanian rugby union players
Romania international rugby union players
Romanian sportswriters